The Power Management Unit (PMU) is a microcontroller that governs power functions of digital platforms. This microchip has many similar components to the average computer, including firmware and software, memory, a CPU, input/output functions, timers to measure intervals of time, and analog to digital converters to measure the voltages of the main battery or power source of the computer. The PMU is one of the few items to remain active even when the computer is completely shut down, powered by the backup battery.

For portable computers, the PMU is responsible for coordinating many functions, including:
Monitoring power connections and battery charges
Charging batteries when necessary
Controlling power to other integrated circuits
Shutting down unnecessary system components when they are left idle
Controlling sleep and power functions (On and Off)
Managing the interface for built in keypad and touchpads on portable computers
Regulating the real-time clock (RTC)

See also 
 Power management integrated circuit (PMIC)
 System Management Unit (SMU)
 System Management Controller (SMC)

References
"Desktop and Portable Systems: Second Edition" Edited by Owen W. Linzmayer

External links
Resetting the PMU on Macbook and MacbookPro computers - contains general information on the PMU

Apple Inc. hardware
Macintosh computers